The Yale Political Union (YPU) is a debate society at Yale University, founded in 1934 by Alfred Whitney Griswold. It was modeled on the Cambridge Union and Oxford Union and the party system of the defunct Yale Unions of the late nineteenth and early twentieth centuries, which were in turn inspired by the great literary debating societies of Linonia and Brothers in Unity. Members of the YPU have reciprocal rights at sister societies in England.

The union is an umbrella organization that currently contains seven parties: the Party of the Left (PoL), the Progressive Party (Progs), the Independent Party (IP), the Federalist Party (Feds), the Conservative Party (CP), the Tory Party (Tories), and the Party of the Right (PoR).

History
    This Union can be of undoubted value to nation and to the University, provided it maintains independence and voices the true thoughts of those participating [...] honest debates will help in the search for truthful answers.
    — Franklin D. Roosevelt, 1935

Founded in 1934, the Yale Political Union originally had three parties: the Liberal Party, the Radical Party (reorganized as the Labor Party in 1937 - now defunct), and the Conservative Party. It has seen the rise and fall of others since. Over the years, the Union has played a key role on Yale's campus. It has had periods of flourishing, as well as less prosperous spells. Once the only organization devoted to political debate on campus, it remains a primary forum for oratory and political dialogue.[3]

Although the Union has fluctuated in its influence over the years, many claim that the Union is not as influential as it once was. Members note that this is the result of several factors. Many believe that it is simply one of the effects of Yale's metamorphosis from Old Yale into the vibrant modern Yale of the 21st century, which has notably included the rise of activism on campus. Eventually, Union debate came to be a combination of a keynote speaker and ensuing student speeches. This push and pull between outside speakers and student debate has characterized the Union for at least thirty years.

The YPU regained strength throughout the 1970s, during which period the Liberal Party was by far the largest, but then suffered a severe blow shortly after A. Bartlett Giamatti became the Yale President. Giamatti, violating numerous agreements and covenants established with the Union, "repurposed" the YPU building/debate hall. Today, it is used for office space and storage.

After several years of rebuilding, the Union recovered its numerical strength. This recovery moved into rapid gear during Spring term of 1984 (under the presidency of Fareed Zakaria) when membership tripled to 900 during a term highlighted by a nationally televised debate. By the end of 1987, active membership rolls comprised over 1,200 members, nearly 1/4 of the entire student body at Yale, and the YPU successfully launched a Model Congress, a magazine, an annual three-day visit to Washington DC (for meetings with Cabinet Members, Supreme Court Justices, IMF and World Bank heads, foreign Ambassadors and the Director of the National Gallery of Art), and an on-topic debate team (which sent two union members overseas to the world debate championships). Then, the one-vote failure of an attempt to acquire the financially significantly stronger Yale International Relations (Model UN) program at Yale in Spring 1987 (which would have made for a political powerhouse on campus), and the earlier 1980s loss of the YPU's dedicated facilities slowed momentum, and membership declined after a poor recruit in the fall of 1988.

In the early 1990s, membership reached its overall peak. It then fell again, as a series of new political organizations on campus diverted politically active Yalies.[7] Though smaller, the parties were relatively stronger and tighter institutions during this period. Most have remained intimate organizations, though with somewhat larger membership, to the current day.

One of the few enduring YPU spinoff publications, Rumpus Magazine, was founded by members of the Progressive and Tory Parties in 1992. For the first 3–4 years of its publication, Rumpus remained closely linked to the YPU. One of the more sordid scandals of the period, involving a member who misappropriated the YPU's long-distance phone access number for calls to a racy 1-900 number from his senior single, was broken by Rumpus in the Fall of 1994.

As more and more Yale undergraduate organizations were founded, the YPU lost its offices under Bingham Hall. It managed to retain its small office on Crown Street, where it currently resides, although the Union has recently begun a capital campaign to raise funds for a new building.[6] During its various moves, irreplaceable historical archives were lost, although the YPU's collection of paraphernalia signed by noteworthy public figures is sizable. The YPU hit a low point in membership in the late 1990s. The YPU President, an Independent Party member, was impeached in the Fall of 1997, leading to the near collapse of the Independent Party. The effects of this crisis took some time to reverse, though by 2001 the Independent Party was largely restored and began a period of significant growth. Now, the Independent Party is consistently the largest party in the Political Union. Although membership remains roughly 30% of its last peak in the 1990s, the Political Union is one of the largest undergraduate organizations at Yale, with approximately 325 members.

Notable alumni

Conservative Party
 John Glenn Beall Jr. (Vice President, Fall 1949), United States Senator from Maryland
 John Bolton (Floor Leader of the Right, 1968), former United States Ambassador to the United Nations
 David Boren, (YPU Speaker), Governor of Oklahoma and U.S. Senator from Oklahoma
 L. Brent Bozell Jr. (YPU President, Spring 1949), conservative activist and Catholic writer
 James L. Buckley, U.S. Senator from New York and Federal Judge on the United States Court of Appeals
 William F. Buckley, founder of National Review and host of Firing Line (in 1967, as an alumnus, was inducted a member of the Party of the Right)
 Fred Krupp (YPU President, Spring 1974), President of the Environmental Defense Fund
 John Watson Lungstrum (Party Chair, Fall 1964 and Spring 1965; Speaker, Fall 1966), Judge for the United States District Court for the District of Kansas
 Edwin Meese (Party Chair, Spring 1951; YPU President, Fall 1951), United States Attorney General
 George Pataki (Party Chair, Fall 1965), Governor of New York
 Raymond Price (Party Chair, Fall 1949 and Spring 1950), speechwriter for President Richard Nixon
 Whitelaw Reid II (Party Chair, Fall 1935), Chairman and President of the New York Herald Tribune
 William Scranton, Governor of Pennsylvania and U.S. Ambassador to the United Nations.
 Lyman Spitzer, theoretical physicist
 Bob Taft, Governor of Ohio
 Robert Taft Jr., United States Senator from Ohio
 William Howard Taft III, U.S. Ambassador to Ireland
 James Harvie Wilkinson III (Party Vice Chair, Fall 1964; YPU President, Fall 1965 and Spring 1966), Judge of the United States Court of Appeals for the Fourth Circuit
 Patrick J. Bumatay, (YPU Treasurer, 1998), Federal Judge on the United States Court of Appeals for the Ninth Circuit
 Meghan Clyne (Party Chair, Spring 2001), speechwriter and Senior Editor of National Affairs
 Avik Roy (Party Chair, Fall 1996), editor of Forbes magazine and Senior Fellow at the Manhattan Institute

Independent Party
 John Avlon (Party Chair, Fall 1994), editor-in-chief of The Daily Beast
 Steven Calabresi (YPU President, Fall 1978), co-founder of the Federalist Society and Professor of Law at Northwestern University
 Austan Goolsbee, Chairman of the Council of Economic Advisers
 R. David Edelman, advisor to President Barack Obama
 John Wertheim (Party Chair, Fall 1987; YPU President, Spring 1988), former Chairman of the Democratic Party of New Mexico
 Jonathan Zittrain, (Party Chair, Spring 1989), professor at Harvard Law School and the Harvard Kennedy School

Labor Party
 Samuel P. Huntington (Party Leader, Fall 1945), political theorist known for The Clash of Civilizations theory

Liberal Party

Akhil Amar (Party Chairman, Spring 1978), Sterling Professor of Law and Political Science at Yale University
 Peter Beinart (Party Chair, Fall 1990) editor of The New Republic
 McGeorge Bundy (Party Chair, Spring 1939), United States National Security Advisor
 William Bundy (YPU President, Spring and Fall 1938), advisor to Presidents John F. Kennedy and Lyndon B. Johnson
 David P. Calleo (Party Chair, Fall 1953; YPU President, Spring 1954), intellectual and political economist
 John F. Kerry (Party Chairman, Spring 1964; YPU President, Fall 1964 and Spring 1965), US Senator, United States Secretary of State and Democratic nominee for President in 2004
 Marvin Krislov (Party Chair, Fall 1979), President of Oberlin College
 Robert C. Lieberman (Party Chair, Spring 1984; YPU Speaker, Fall 1984), former provost of Johns Hopkins University
 John J. O'Leary (Party Chair, Spring 1967; YPU President, Fall 1967 and Spring 1968), United States Ambassador to Chile
 Richard Posner (Party Chair, Spring 1957), Judge for the United States Court of Appeals for the Seventh Circuit
 Kevin Ryan (Party Chair, Fall 1982), founder and CEO of Gilt Groupe
 Potter Stewart, Associate Justice of the United States Supreme Court
 Katherine Tai, United States Trade Representative
 H. Bradford Westerfield (YPU President, Fall 1945), Yale Professor of International Studies and Political Science
 Evan Wolfson (Speaker, 1976), President of Freedom to Marry
 Neal Wolin (YPU President, Fall 1981), Deputy Secretary of the U.S. Department of the Treasury

Party of the Right
 Richard S. Arnold (YPU Vice President, Fall 1955), former Judge for the United States Court of Appeals for the Eighth Circuit
 Richard Brookhiser (Party Chair, Spring 1975), author and Senior Editor at National Review.
 Brian Carney, member of the Editorial Board at The Wall Street Journal
 Richard Cowan (Party Chair, Autumn 1960), Co-Founder of Freedom Leaf, Inc., editor in chief of Freedom Leaf Magazine, and former director of the National Organization for the Reform of Marijuana Laws (NORML)
 Maggie Gallagher (Party Chair, Spring 1981), President of the National Organization for Marriage
 Paul Gottfried, former professor at Elizabethtown College
 Peter Keisler (Party Chair, Autumn 1979; Speaker), co-founder of the Federalist Society
 Walter Olson (Party Chair, Spring 1974), Senior Fellow at the Cato Institute
 Eugene B. Meyer (Party Chair, Autumn 1974), President of the Federalist Society
 Robert Pollock (Party Chair, Autumn 1993), member of the Editorial Board at The Wall Street Journal
 Grover Rees III (Party Chair, Spring 1971), United States Ambassador to the Democratic Republic of East Timor
 Jerry Smith (Party Chair, Fall 1967), Judge for the United States Court of Appeals for the Fifth Circuit
 Matthias Storme, Professor of Law at Catholic University Leuven
 Eve Tushnet (Party Chair, Spring 2000), author of Gay and Catholic: Accepting My Sexuality, Finding Community, Living My Faith
 Fareed Zakaria (YPU President, Spring 1984), editor-at-large of Time

Progressive Party
 David M. McIntosh (YPU President, Fall 1979), U.S. Representative from Indiana and President of the Club for Growth
 Dana Milbank (Party Chair), columnist for The Washington Post

Tory Party
 Michael J. Astrue (Party Chairman, 1975; YPU President, 1977), former Commissioner of the Social Security Administration
 David Frum, journalist, speechwriter, commentator, and author
 Keith Ferrazzi (Party Chairman, 1985), author of Never Eat Alone
 Michael J. Knowles, actor, author, and political commentator
 Jim O'Neill (investor), speechwriter and co-founder of the Thiel Fellowship
 Patrick F. Philbin (Party Chairman, Spring 1988), Deputy White House Counsel and Assistant Attorney General. 
 Lauren Willig (Party Chairman, Spring 1998), New York Times bestselling author of historical romance fiction novels

Related

 List of Yale University student organizations
 Yale International Relations Association
 Yale Debate Association
 Berkeley Forum

References

External links
 

Yale University
Student debating societies